Cripple Creek-Victor Junior/Senior High School is a high school in Cripple Creek, Colorado, United States, also serving the city of Victor. It is the sole high school in the Cripple Creek-Victor School District RE-1.

Notable alumni

 Ralph Lawrence Carr
 Lowell Thomas – class of 1910
 Rileah Vanderbilt – class of 1998; film and television star
A. M. Watson - class of 1994; inventor and author of "Infants of the Brush: A Chimney Sweep's Story"

References

External links
 District website

Public high schools in Colorado
Schools in Teller County, Colorado
Public middle schools in Colorado